Jake Ellenberger (born March 28, 1985) is an American retired mixed martial artist and former United States Marine who was known for competing in the Ultimate Fighting Championship (UFC). A professional competitor from 2005–2018, Ellenberger has also formerly competed for the Quad Cities Silverbacks of the IFL,  Bodog Fight, and King of the Cage.

Background

Jake Ellenberger was born in Omaha, Nebraska. Jake's father was an iron worker, and his twin brother named Joe, was also an MMA fighter. After starting his career with a 10–0 record, Joe was diagnosed with an extremely rare blood disease called Paroxysmal nocturnal hemoglobinuria when he was 24 years old. Some estimates suggest that roughly half of the people diagnosed with PNH die within 10 years of their diagnosis. Joe still cornered his brother's fights and is a huge inspiration for Jake. Both Jake and Joe were very athletic growing up; Jake was on the swimming and diving team at Millard South High School, while Joe wrestled and played football. Joe won a Nebraska wrestling state title his senior year. Joe then went on to wrestle at the University of Nebraska-Kearney and became a two-time NCAA Division II All-American, finishing third in the country twice and was a three-time academic All-American. 

Jake began training for MMA when he saw his friend fight for the welterweight title in the Victory Fighting Championships. He studied psychology at the University of Nebraska-Omaha for three years and was on the school's NCAA Division II wrestling team. Following the end of his own wrestling career and acting as assistant coach, Jake helped his alma mater to win back to back National titles. Jake Ellenberger is also a former Marine, having served as a heavy equipment mechanic (military occupational specialty 1341).

Mixed martial arts career

International Fight League
Ellenberger suffered the first loss of his career by unanimous decision to Jay Hieron in his IFL debut. In Ellenberger's second IFL appearance, he defeated Ben Uker by TKO in the second round at IFL: Championship Final. Ellenberger filled in on short notice for an injured Rory Markham and represented Pat Miletich's Quad City Silverbacks at the 2007 Team Championship Final. He suffered his only submission loss to Brazilian jiu-jitsu black belt Delson Heleno. In his last fight for the promotion, Ellenberger dominated his opponent, Pat Healy over three rounds to win a unanimous decision at IFL: Las Vegas.

BodogFight
At the event entitled Clash of the Nations, held in St. Petersburg, Russia, Ellenberger lost a unanimous decision to UFC veteran Derrick Noble. He then traveled to Costa Rica and defeated another UFC veteran, Zach Light, via TKO at Costa Rica Combat. In his last appearance with BodogFight, Ellenberger knocked out Jose Landi-Jons in just nine seconds.

M-1 Challenge
Ellenberger represented the United States at M-1 Challenges in Japan and South Korea. In his first bout held in Japan, Ellenberger defeated Frenchman Farouk Lakebir by unanimous decision. In his next fight, held in Korea, Ellenberger defeated Doo Won Seo via TKO in round two.

Bellator
Ellenberger won his fight against Marcelo Alfaya at Bellator 11 by knockout just 42 seconds into the first round.

Ultimate Fighting Championship
Ellenberger stepped in on short notice for an injured Chris Lytle and lost a split decision in his promotional debut at UFC Fight Night 19 against Carlos Condit.

Ellenberger rebounded by defeating Mike Pyle via second-round TKO on January 2, 2010, at UFC 108.

Ellenberger was set to face Ben Saunders at UFC 111 in Newark, New Jersey as a replacement for the injured Martin Kampmann; however, once Jon Fitch's original opponent, Thiago Alves, was forced out due to a brain irregularity, Saunders requested and was granted a fight against Fitch instead. Due to the last minute switch, Ellenberger was still paid win and show money.

Ellenberger defeated John Howard via third-round TKO at UFC Live: Jones vs. Matyushenko. Ellenberger caused Howard's left eye to close after repeatedly landing short elbows and punches from the closed guard.

Ellenberger was expected to face Jon Fitch on February 5, 2011, at UFC 126, but Fitch was pulled from the bout in favor with a matchup with BJ Penn at UFC 127. Ellenberger instead faced the then-undefeated Carlos Eduardo Rocha at UFC 126 and won the fight via split decision.

Ellenberger faced Sean Pierson on April 30, 2011, at UFC 129, replacing an injured Brian Foster, and won the fight via first-round KO on 17 days notice.

Ellenberger faced Jake Shields on September 17, 2011, at UFC Fight Night 25.  He won the fight via TKO only 53 seconds into the first round. The finish earned him the Knockout of the Night honors.

A bout between Ellenberger and Diego Sanchez was briefly linked to UFC 141. However, a lingering hand injury ended up keeping Sanchez out of action until February 2012.

The Ellenberger/Sanchez bout took place on February 15, 2012, at UFC on Fuel TV 1 Ellenberger defeated Sanchez via unanimous decision, in a bout that earned both fighters Fight of the Night honors.

Ellenberger lost to Martin Kampmann via second-round KO (knees) on June 1, 2012, at The Ultimate Fighter 15 Finale.

Ellenberger was expected to face Josh Koscheck on September 1, 2012, at UFC 151.  However, Koscheck pulled out of the bout citing a back injury and was replaced by returning UFC veteran Jay Hieron. Hieron gave Ellenberger his first loss six years earlier. After the UFC 151 event was cancelled, Ellenberger/Hieron took place on October 5, 2012, at UFC on FX 5. Ellenberger won the fight via unanimous decision (29-28, 29–28, 29–28).

Ellenberger was expected to face Johny Hendricks on March 16, 2013, UFC 158.  However, Hendricks was pulled from the Ellenberger bout in favor of a matchup with Carlos Condit at the event after Condit's original opponent Rory MacDonald, pulled out of the bout with an injury.  Ellenberger instead faced returning veteran Nate Marquardt. Ellenberger defeated Marquardt via spectacular first-round knockout.  The win also garnered him his second Knockout of the Night bonus.

Ellenberger faced Rory MacDonald on July 27, 2013, at UFC on Fox 8. MacDonald was able to use his size and reach advantage to repeatedly land his jab, neutralizing the shorter Ellenberger, resulting in a unanimous decision victory. UFC president Dana White criticized the performance as "lackluster".

Ellenberger was expected to face Tarec Saffiedine on January 4, 2014, at UFC Fight Night 34.  However, in late November, Ellenberger pulled out of the bout citing a hamstring injury and was replaced by Hyun Gyu Lim.

On April 9, 2014, Ellenberger revealed that he had signed an eight-fight contract with UFC with disclosed title clauses should he be a champion in the future.

The bout with Saffiedine was rebooked for UFC 172. However, on March 28, 2014, Saffiedine pulled out of the fight with an undisclosed injury. Ellenberger instead faced Robbie Lawler at UFC 173 on May 24, 2014. He lost the fight via TKO in the third round due to a combination of a knee and punches.

Ellenberger next faced Kelvin Gastelum on November 15, 2014, at UFC 180. He lost the fight via submission in the first round.

Ellenberger faced Josh Koscheck on February 28, 2015, at UFC 184. Ellenberger won the fight via submission in the second round, his first submission victory in nine years.  It also earned Ellenberger a Performance of the Night bonus.

Ellenberger faced Stephen Thompson on July 12, 2015, at The Ultimate Fighter 21 Finale. He lost the fight via KO due to a spinning hook kick and punches in the first round.

Ellenberger faced Tarec Saffiedine on January 30, 2016, at UFC on Fox 18. He lost the fight by unanimous decision.

Ellenberger faced Matt Brown on July 30, 2016, at UFC 201. He won the fight by TKO in the first round and also picked up a Performance of the Night bonus.

Ellenberger faced Jorge Masvidal on December 3, 2016, at The Ultimate Fighter 24 Finale. He lost the fight by TKO in the first round after his foot became entangled in the fence, rendering him unable to defend himself from Masvidal's strikes.

Ellenberger faced Mike Perry on April 22, 2017, at UFC Fight Night: Swanson vs. Lobov. He lost the fight via KO (elbow) in the second round.

Ellenberger was expected to face Bryan Barberena on June 1, 2018, at UFC Fight Night 131. However, on March 23, 2018, Barberena pulled out due to injury. He will be replaced by Ben Saunders. Ellenberger lost by TKO after being dropped by knee to the body in the first round.

The pairing with Barberena was rescheduled and took place on August 25, 2018, at UFC Fight Night 135. Ellenberger lost the fight by TKO in the first round and subsequently announced his retirement from Mixed Martial Arts.

Championships and accomplishments

Mixed martial arts
Ultimate Fighting Championship
Fight of the Night (One time)
Performance of the Night (Two times)
Knockout of the Night (Two times)
Sherdog
2011 All-Violence Second Team

Mixed martial arts record

|-
|Loss
|align=center|31–15
|Bryan Barberena
|TKO (punches)
|UFC Fight Night: Gaethje vs. Vick
|
|align=center|1
|align=center|2:26
|Lincoln, Nebraska, United States
|
|-
|Loss
|align=center|31–14
|Ben Saunders
|KO (knee to the body)
|UFC Fight Night: Rivera vs. Moraes
|
|align=center|1
|align=center|1:56
|Utica, New York, United States
|
|-
|Loss
|align=center|31–13
|Mike Perry
|KO (elbow)
|UFC Fight Night: Swanson vs. Lobov
|
|align=center|2
|align=center|1:05
|Nashville, Tennessee, United States
|
|-
|Loss
|align=center|31–12
|Jorge Masvidal
|TKO (punches)
|The Ultimate Fighter: Tournament of Champions Finale
|
|align=center|1
|align=center|4:05
|Las Vegas, Nevada, United States
|
|-
|Win
|align=center|31–11
|Matt Brown
|TKO (kick to the body and punches)
|UFC 201 
|
|align=center|1
|align=center|1:46
|Atlanta, Georgia, United States
|
|-
|Loss
|align=center|30–11
|Tarec Saffiedine
|Decision (unanimous)
|UFC on Fox: Johnson vs. Bader
|
|align=center|3
|align=center|5:00
|Newark, New Jersey, United States
|
|-
|Loss
|align=center|30–10
|Stephen Thompson
|KO (spinning wheel kick)
|The Ultimate Fighter: American Top Team vs. Blackzilians Finale 
|
|align=center|1
|align=center|4:29
|Las Vegas, Nevada, United States
|
|-
|Win
|align=center|30–9
| Josh Koscheck
|Submission (north-south choke)
| UFC 184
| 
|align=center|2
|align=center|4:20
| Los Angeles, California, United States
| 
|-
| Loss
| align=center|29–9
| Kelvin Gastelum
| Submission (rear-naked choke)
| UFC 180
| 
| align=center|1
| align=center|4:46
| Mexico City, Mexico
| 
|-
| Loss
| align=center| 29–8
| Robbie Lawler
| TKO (knee and punches)
| UFC 173
| 
| align=center| 3
| align=center| 3:06
| Las Vegas, Nevada, United States
| 
|-
| Loss
| align=center| 29–7
| Rory MacDonald
| Decision (unanimous)
| UFC on Fox: Johnson vs. Moraga
| 
| align=center| 3
| align=center| 5:00
| Seattle, Washington, United States
| 
|-
| Win
| align=center| 29–6
| Nate Marquardt
| KO (punches)
| UFC 158
| 
| align=center| 1
| align=center| 3:00
| Montreal, Quebec, Canada  
| 
|-
| Win 
| align=center| 28–6
| Jay Hieron
| Decision (unanimous)
| UFC on FX: Browne vs. Bigfoot
| 
| align=center| 3
| align=center| 5:00
| Minneapolis, Minnesota, United States 
| 
|-
| Loss
| align=center| 27–6
| Martin Kampmann
| TKO (knees)
| The Ultimate Fighter: Live Finale
| 
| align=center| 2
| align=center| 1:40
| Las Vegas, Nevada, United States
| 
|-
| Win 
| align=center| 27–5
| Diego Sanchez
| Decision (unanimous)
| UFC on Fuel TV: Sanchez vs. Ellenberger
| 
| align=center| 3
| align=center| 5:00
| Omaha, Nebraska, United States
| 
|-
| Win 
| align=center| 26–5
| Jake Shields
| TKO (knee and punches)
| UFC Fight Night: Shields vs. Ellenberger
| 
| align=center| 1
| align=center| 0:53
| New Orleans, Louisiana, United States
| 
|-
| Win 
| align=center| 25–5
| Sean Pierson
| KO (punches)
| UFC 129
| 
| align=center| 1
| align=center| 2:42
| Toronto, Ontario, Canada
| 
|-
| Win
| align=center| 24–5
| Carlos Eduardo Rocha
| Decision (split)
| UFC 126
| 
| align=center| 3
| align=center| 5:00
| Las Vegas, Nevada, United States
| 
|-
| Win
| align=center| 23–5
| John Howard
| TKO (doctor stoppage)
| UFC Live: Jones vs. Matyushenko
| 
| align=center| 3
| align=center| 2:21
| San Diego, California, United States
| 
|-
| Win
| align=center| 22–5
| Mike Pyle
| TKO (punches)
| UFC 108
| 
| align=center| 2
| align=center| 0:22
| Las Vegas, Nevada, United States
| 
|-
| Loss
| align=center| 21–5
| Carlos Condit
| Decision (split)
| UFC Fight Night: Diaz vs. Guillard
| 
| align=center| 3
| align=center| 5:00
| Oklahoma City, Oklahoma, United States
| 
|-
| Win
| align=center| 21–4
| Marcelo Alfaya
| KO (punch)
| Bellator 11
| 
| align=center| 1
| align=center| 0:42
| Uncasville, Connecticut, United States
| 
|-
| Win
| align=center| 20–4
| Brendan Seguin
| Decision (unanimous)
| VFC 27: Mayhem
| 
| align=center| 3
| align=center| 5:00
| Council Bluffs, Iowa, United States
| 
|-
| Win
| align=center| 19–4
| Doo Won Seo
| TKO (doctor stoppage)
| M-1 Challenge 6: Korea
| 
| align=center| 2
| align=center| 3:04
| Seoul, South Korea
| 
|-
| Win
| align=center| 18–4
| Farouk Lakebir
| Decision (majority)
| M-1 Challenge 5: Japan
| 
| align=center| 2
| align=center| 5:00
| Tokyo, Japan
| 
|-
| Loss
| align=center| 17–4
| Rick Story
| Decision (unanimous)
| SF 23: Heated Rivals
| 
| align=center| 3
| align=center| 5:00
| Portland, Oregon, United States
| 
|-
| Win
| align=center| 17–3
| Pat Healy
| Decision (unanimous)
| IFL: Las Vegas
| 
| align=center| 3
| align=center| 4:00
| Las Vegas, Nevada, United States
| 
|-
| Win
| align=center| 16–3
| Jose Landi-Jons
| KO (punch)
| EFC 5: Revolution
| 
| align=center| 1
| align=center| 0:09
| Prince George, British Columbia, Canada
| 
|-
| Loss
| align=center| 15–3
| Delson Heleno
| Submission (armbar)
| IFL: 2007 Team Championship Final
| 
| align=center| 2
| align=center| 3:45
| Hollywood, Florida, United States
| 
|-
| Win
| align=center| 15–2
| Zach Light
| TKO (punches)
| Bodog Fight: Costa Rica Combat
| 
| align=center| 1
| align=center| 3:51
| San José, Costa Rica
| 
|-
| Win
| align=center| 14–2
| Ben Uker
| TKO (punches)
| IFL : Championship Final
| 
| align=center| 2
| align=center| 1:44
| Uncasville, Connecticut, United States
| 
|-
| Loss
| align=center| 13–2
| Derrick Noble
| Decision (unanimous)
| Bodog Fight: Clash of the Nations
| 
| align=center| 3
| align=center| 5:00
| St. Petersburg, Russia
| 
|-
| Win
| align=center| 13–1
| Ryan Stout
| TKO (punches)
| IFC: Rumble on the River 2
| 
| align=center| 2
| align=center| 4:06
| Kearney, Nebraska, United States
| 
|-
| Loss
| align=center| 12–1
| Jay Hieron
| Decision (unanimous)
| IFL: Championship 2006
| 
| align=center| 3
| align=center| 4:00
| Atlantic City, New Jersey, United States
| 
|-
| Win
| align=center| 12–0
| Gil Castillo
| TKO (punches)
| IFC: Caged Combat
| 
| align=center| 1
| align=center| 1:30
| Sacramento, California, United States
| 
|-
| Win
| align=center| 11–0
| Kenneth Allen
| Submission (armbar)
| IFC: Rumble on the River
| 
| align=center| 1
| align=center| N/A
| Kearney, Nebraska, United States
| 
|-
| Win
| align=center| 10–0
| Mark Bear
| TKO (doctor stoppage)
| VFC 12: Warpath
| 
| align=center| 2
| align=center| N/A
| Council Bluffs, Iowa, United States
| 
|-
| Win
| align=center| 9–0
| Laverne Clark
| Submission (triangle choke)
| KOTC 64: Raging Bull
| 
| align=center| 2
| align=center| 3:06
| Cleveland, Ohio, United States
| 
|-
| Win
| align=center| 8–0
| Sean Huffman
| TKO (submission to punches)
| VFC 11: Demolition
| 
| align=center| 3
| align=center| 0:22
| Council Bluffs, Iowa, United States
| 
|-
| Win
| align=center| 7–0
| Brian Daley
| TKO (punches)
| AFC 4: New Hitter
| 
| align=center| 1
| align=center| 1:31
| Omaha, Nebraska, United States
| 
|-
| Win
| align=center| 6–0
| Evan Boemer
| KO (punches)
| Extreme Challenge 65
| 
| align=center| 1
| align=center| 0:48
| Medina, Minnesota, United States
| 
|-
| Win
| align=center| 5–0
| Brent Shepard
| KO (punch)
| All Fighting Championships 3
| 
| align=center| 1
| align=center| N/A
| Omaha, Nebraska, United States
| 
|-
| Win
| align=center| 4–0
| Deryck Ripley
| TKO (submission to punches)
| VFC 10: Championship X
| 
| align=center| 1
| align=center| 1:41
| Council Bluffs, Iowa, United States
| 
|-
| Win
| align=center| 3–0
| Brad Fox 
| TKO (punches)
| ROF 17: Unstoppable 	
| 
| align=center| 2
| align=center| 2:15
| Castle Rock, Colorado, United States
| 
|-
| Win
| align=center| 2–0
| Cory Simpson
| Submission (choke)
| XKK: Des Moines
| 
| align=center| 3
| align=center| N/A
| Des Moines, Iowa, United States
| 
|-
| Win
| align=center| 1–0
| Cameron Wells
| TKO (punches)
| AFC 1: Takedown
| 
| align=center| 1
| align=center| N/A
| Omaha, Nebraska, United States
| 

Personal
On March 1, 2016, at the Hollywood Walk of Fame, Ellenberger was interviewed in the segment Lie Witness News'' of talk show Jimmy Kimmel Live. He was caught lying about having voted for Donald Trump in the presidential primaries at Super Tuesday that morning, yet the election for California was not held until June 7, 2016. However, multiple people who were previously featured on the segment claimed that the answers were taken out of context; others stated that they were playing along, knowing that it was a joke.

See also
 List of male mixed martial artists

References

External links
 
 

1985 births
Living people
American male mixed martial artists
Mixed martial artists from Nebraska
Sportspeople from Omaha, Nebraska
Welterweight mixed martial artists
Mixed martial artists utilizing collegiate wrestling
Mixed martial artists utilizing Brazilian jiu-jitsu
People from Lake Forest, California
University of Nebraska Omaha alumni
United States Marines
Ultimate Fighting Championship male fighters
American practitioners of Brazilian jiu-jitsu